Izaah JB Knox (born c. 1977) is an American politician currently elected as the senator for the 17th District of the Iowa Senate.

Early life, education, and career
Knox was born in Iowa City, Iowa. He grew up between Cedar Rapids, Iowa and Seattle, WA. He graduated from Cedar Rapids Washington High School, then Drake University, where he completed a bachelor's degree in public relations and marketing. After working as a life coach and with the Urban Dreams nonprofit organization in Des Moines, Knox returned to Drake, earning a master's degree in organizational leadership and policy studies. He then worked for Des Moines Area Community College, and subsequently pursued doctoral study at Iowa State University, eventually returning to Urban Dreams as executive director. Knox took over the organization from founder Wayne Ford.

Political career
Knox began his campaign for the Iowa Senate in January 2022. Knox defeated Grace Van Cleave in a June 2022 Democratic Party primary, then won the general election for District 17 against Libertarian Party candidate ToyA Johnson and political independent Alejandro Murguia-Ortiz. Knox is of African-American descent. During the 2022 legislative election cycle, Knox was endorsed by Thomas Mann Jr., Iowa's first Black state senator who left office in 1989, Knox is the second Black senator.

Personal life
Knox is married and has three children.

References

1970s births
People from Cedar Falls, Iowa
Living people
Iowa State University alumni
Democratic Party Iowa state senators
Politicians from Des Moines, Iowa
African-American state legislators in Iowa
Drake University alumni
21st-century American politicians